Simon I the Great, also known as Svimon  (1537–1611), of the Bagrationi dynasty, was a Georgian king of Kartli from 1556 to 1569 and again from 1578 to 1599. His first tenure was marked by war against the Persian domination of Georgia. In 1569 he was captured by the Persians, and spent nine years in captivity. In 1578 he was released and reinstalled in Kartli. During this period (i.e. his second tenure), he fought as a Persian subject against the Ottoman domination of Georgia. In 1599 Simon I was captured by the Ottomans and died in captivity. During 1557 to 1569 he was known as Mahmud Khan and from 1578 to 1599 as Shahnavaz Khan.

First reign and struggle against Persia
The eldest son of the heroic king Luarsab I of Kartli and Tamar of Imereti, he commanded his father's army at the Battle of Garisi against the Persian invaders, 1556. He was proclaimed by his father co-ruler and heir apparent just prior to the action. Though Luarsab was mortally wounded, the battle was won by Simon, who soon ascended the throne on the death of his father. As the Kartlian capital Tbilisi remained in the Persian hands, Simon had a residence in Gori, whence he ruled over the territories recaptured from the occupiers. In 1559, he allied himself with another Georgian sovereign, Levan I of Kakheti, and married his daughter Nestan-Darejan. Beginning in 1560, Simon launched a series of battles to recover Tbilisi, but in April 1561 suffered a defeat at the Battle of Tsikhedidi, which cost life to his brother-in-law and ally, Prince Giorgi of Kakheti. His brother, David, recently submitted to the Safavid Shah Tahmasp I, converted to Islam, and returned with a Persian army to claim the crown. Simon blockaded Tbilisi and won the battles at Dighomi (1567) and Samadlo (1569), but he was finally defeated and taken prisoner at P'artskhisi, 1569. David, now known as Daud Khan, was made by Persians a tributary king of Kartli. Simon was sent to Persia where he refused to convert to Islam and was imprisoned at the fortress of Alamut for nine years.

Second reign and struggle against the Ottomans

 
When the peace between the Safavids and the Ottomans collapsed and the Turkish general Lala Mustafa Pasha drove the Persians out of Georgia in 1578, it roused the Safavids to come to take further action. Then incumbent Safavid king Mohammad Khodabanda wanted a puppet ruler in Kartli that was popular amongst the local population. Therefore, he ordered for Simon I to be released from prison and offered him the crown of Kartli on the demand that he would convert to Islam. Having been imprisoned for nine years, Simon I's resolve was weakened. In the same year he accepted the Safavid king's demands, and, in order to invade Tbilisi, he received cannon and 5,000 Qizilbash soldiers led by general Ali-Qoli Khan. Simon led a successful guerilla war against the Turks, recovered most of Kartli by 1579, and put a siege to Tbilisi. At the same time, he induced the prince Manuchar II Jaqeli to revolt against the Ottoman rule in Akhaltsikhe, and attempted to get support from Pope Clement VIII, Emperor Rudolph II and Philip II of Spain. The negotiations, however, failed to yield any serious results.

In 1580 Simon I repulsed Ottoman invasion of Kartli, and in 1582 defeated main Ottoman army on the field of Mukhrani, which had a lasting impact as Ottomans were at the height of their power and such a defeat shuttered the myth of their invincibility. Simon I's Persian monolingual seal of the same period reads: "Allah, who has no equal, knows that Semiyun (Simon) is a slave of the Shah from the bottom of his heart, 933 (1585)".

From 1588 to 1590, Simon interfered on three occasions into a power struggle in the western Georgian kingdom of Imereti, and though victorious over Levan of Imereti at the Battle of Gop'anto (1588), he was finally defeated at Op'shkviti and driven out with the help of the Turks. Finally, the Ottomans prevailed and their recently appointed commander, Ferhad Pasha, was able to conquer Kartli by 1588. Simon had to make peace with the Sublime Porte and agreed to pay an annual tribute. By a peace treaty signed in Constantinople on March 21, 1590, the Safavids also recognised all of Georgia as an Ottoman possession. Simon, however, resumed his struggle against the occupants in 1595, and retook Gori after a long-lasting siege in 1599. The sultan Mehmed III sent a large punitive force led by Jafar Pasha, beylerbey of Van. Simon met it at the Battle of Nakhiduri, but he was severely defeated and taken captive while retreating, 1599.

Upon the Simon's arrest the Sultan Mehmed III made the following order:

Simon was sent to Constantinople where the Georgian noblewoman Gulchara was brought to care for the aged king. He died in 1611 as a prisoner at the Fortress of the Seven Towers (Yedikule) without converting to Sunni Islam, shortly before the cessation of the Ottoman–Safavid hostilities. His body was then redeemed by the Georgians and buried at the Svetitskhoveli Cathedral at Mtskheta next to his father.

Family and children
Simon married in 1559 Nestan-Darejan (died c. 1612), daughter of Levan I of Kakheti. They had six children, four sons and two daughters:

 Prince Giorgi (c. 1560 – 1606), King of Kartli as George X;
 Prince Luarsab (fl. 1561–1589), taken as a hostage to Iran in 1582;
 Prince Aleksandre (fl. 1561–1589);
 Prince Vakhtang (fl. 1600);
 Princess Elene (fl. 1583–1609), wife of Manuchar II Jaqeli, Atabag of Samtskhe;
 Princess Fahrijan-Begum (fl. 1582), who married Shahzada Sultan Hamza Mirza (died in 1578 or 1586), son of Shah Tahmasp I or Mohammed Khodabanda.

References

Sources
 
 
 
Svimon I (In Georgian)
 History of Iranian-Georgian relations by Keith Hitchins at Iranica.com

Further reading
გუჩუა ვ., სვანიძე მ., ქართველი ხალხის ბრძოლა დამოუკიდებლობისა და პოლიტიკური მთლიანობის აღდგენისათვის XVI საუკუნეში. საქართველოს ისტორიის ნარკვევები, IV, თბ., 1973
მამისთვალიშვილი ე., საქართველოს საგარეო პოლიტიკური ურთიერთობანი XV საუკუნის მეორე ნახევარსა და XV I საუკუნეში (ევროპული წყაროების მიხედვით), თბ., 1981.
ტაბაღუა ი., საქართველო ევროპის არქივებსა და წიგნსაცავებში, III, თბ., 1987
ტარდი ლ., უნგრეთ-საქართველოს ურთიერთობა XVI საუკუნეში, თბ., 198
ბატონიშვილი ვახუშტი, აღწერა სამეფოსა საქართველოსა, `ქართლის ცხოვრება~, ტ. IV. თბილისი, 1973.
ბერი ეგნატაშვილი, ახალი ქართლის ცხოვრება, ქართლის ცხოვრება, ტექსტი დადგენილია ყველა ძირითადი ხელნაწერის მიხედვით ს. ყაუხჩიშვილის მიერ, ტ.II, თბილისი, 1959.
ისქანდერი მუნშის ცნობები საქართველოს შესახებ, სპარსული ტექსტი ქართული თარგმანითა და შესავლითურთ გამოსცა ვლ. ფუთურიძემ, თბილისი, 1969.
მუსტაფა ნაიმა, ცნობები საქართველოსა და კავკასიის შესახებ, თურქული ტექსტი ქართული თარგმანით, გამოკვლევითა და შენიშვნებით გამოსაცემად მოამზადა ნ. შენგელიამ, თბილისი, 1979.
გ. თოფურიძე, მუსტაფა სელიანიქი საქართველოს შესახებ, თსუ-ს შრომები, 91, თბილისი, 1962.
ს. ჯიქია, მ. სვანიძე, საქართველო-თურქეთის ურთიერთობის ისტორიიდან, `მაცნე~, ისტორიის სერია, 1966, #6.
ვალ. გაბაშვილი, თბილისი XVI_XVII სს-ის აღმოსავლურ წყაროებში, თსუ-ს შრომები, ტ.99, თბილისი, 1962.
საქართველოს ისტორიის ნარკვევები, ტ.IV, თბილისი, 1973.
მ. სვანიძე, საქართველო-ოსმალეთის ურთიერთობის ისტორიიდან XVI_XVII სს. თბილისი, 1971.
ც. აბულაძე, სიმონ მეფის არზა სულთან მურად III-ს, მრავალთავი, ტ.XII, თბილისი, 1980.
თ. ნატროშვილი, დელი-სვიმონი, საქართველო ათასწლეულთა გასაყარზე, თბილისი, 2005.
Danişmend I.H. Izahlı Osmanlı Tarihi Kronolojisi. V. III.
Kirzioğlu, Osmanlilarin Kafkas Ellerini Fethi. Ankara 1998.
Roin Shantadze, I. Simon’un Sanatkar Kişiliği, "Cveneburebi", Istanbul, 2004
Tardy L., Le Roi Simon Ier à la lumière des sources d’Europe Centrale contemporaines de son èpoque. I partie. “Bedi Kartlisa. Revue de Kartvèlologie”
Hammer J., Geschichte des osmanischen Reiches, II B Pest, 1834.

Bagrationi dynasty of the Kingdom of Kartli
Safavid appointed kings of Kartli
Prisoners and detainees of Safavid Iran
Prisoners who died in Ottoman detention
Rebellions against Safavid Iran
Rebellions against the Ottoman Empire
Safavid generals
Eastern Orthodox monarchs
1537 births
1611 deaths
16th-century people from Georgia (country)
Shia Muslims from Georgia (country)
Converts to Shia Islam from Eastern Orthodoxy
Former Georgian Orthodox Christians
17th-century people of Safavid Iran
People from Georgia (country) who died in prison custody